Bastock is an English surname. Notable people with the surname include:

 Paul Bastock (born 1970), English footballer
 Archie Bastock (1869–1964), Welsh footballer
 Margaret Bastock (1920–1984), English zoologist and geneticist

See also
Bostock (surname)

English-language surnames